Lasmigona holstonia, the Tennessee heelsplitter, is a species of freshwater mussel, an aquatic bivalve mollusk in the family Unionidae.

This species is endemic to the United States.

References

Molluscs of the United States
holstonia
Bivalves described in 1838
Taxonomy articles created by Polbot